Why Pick on Me? is a 1937 British comedy film directed by Maclean Rogers and starring Wylie Watson, Jack Hobbs and Sybil Grove. It was made at Walton Studios. It was made as a quota quickie for release by the American company RKO Pictures.

Cast
 Wylie Watson as Sam Tippett  
 Jack Hobbs as Stretton  
 Sybil Grove as Mrs. Tippett  
 Max Adrian as Jack Mills  
 Isobel Scaife as Daisy Mog  
 Elizabeth Kent as Bubbles

References

Bibliography
 Chibnall, Steve & McFarlane, Brian. The British 'B' Film. Palgrave MacMillan, 2009.
 Wood, Linda. British Films, 1927-1939. British Film Institute, 1986.

External links

1937 films
British comedy films
1937 comedy films
Films shot at Nettlefold Studios
Films directed by Maclean Rogers
British black-and-white films
1930s English-language films
1930s British films